Blethisa is a genus of ground beetle native to the Palearctic. It contains the following species:

 Blethisa catenaria Brown, 1944
 Blethisa eschscholtzii Zoubkoff, 1829
 Blethisa hudsonica Casey, 1924
 Blethisa inexpectata Goulet & Smetana, 1983
 Blethisa julii LeConte, 1863
 Blethisa multipunctata Linnaeus, 1758
 Blethisa oregonensis LeConte, 1853
 Blethisa pleistocenica Lomnicki, 1894
 Blethisa quadricollis Haldeman, 1847
 Blethisa tuberculata Motschulsky, 1844

References

External links
Blethisa at Fauna Europaea

 
Taxa named by Franco Andrea Bonelli
Carabidae genera